Academic integrity is the moral code or ethical policy of academia. The term was popularized by the R.C  (USA), who is considered to be the "grandfather of academic integrity".  Other prominent academic integrity scholars and advocates include Tracey Bretag (Australia), Cath Ellis (Australia), Sarah Elaine Eaton (Canada), Thomas Lancaster (UK), Tomáš Foltýnek (Czech Republic), and Tricia Bertram Gallant (USA). Academic integrity supports the enactment of educational values through behaviours such as the  avoidance of cheating, plagiarism, and contract cheating, as well as the maintenance of academic standards; honesty and rigor in research and academic publishing.

Historical evolution 
During the late 18th century, academic integrity was tightly correlated to the academic honor code (United States).  This was monitored mainly by the students and surrounding culture of the time.  The honor code focused on duty, pride, power, and self-esteem. Any act promoting the uprising or building of any of these within an individual was the goal.  Thus, academic integrity was tied solely to the status and appearance of upstanding character of the individual.  Any acts of academic dishonesty performed to maintain their good name was seen as a necessary means to an end.

It wasn't until the end of the 19th century when the goals of the university changed that the concept of academic integrity changed.  Academics of this era were required to teach and produce original research.  The pressure to acquire tenure and publish added extra stress to their jobs, though acts of academic dishonesty were viewed as acts of follies.  Still, the honor code concept of academic integrity was evolving into a more contemporary concept.  Academic integrity was now beginning to replace honor of the individual honor to the university as an institution. Such an evolution was important to promote unity throughout the academic institution and encourage students to hold each other accountable for dishonest acts.  It also allowed the students to feel empowered through the self-monitoring of each other.

As the importance of original research grew among faculty members the questioning of research integrity grew as well.  With so much pressure linked to their professional status professor were under intense scrutiny by the surrounding society.  This inevitably led to the separating academic integrity ideals for student and faculty. By 1970 most universities in the United States had established honor codes for their student body and faculty members, although this concept has not really caught on elsewhere in the world (e.g. see Yakovchuk et al.).

Improvements in information technology have created challenges within academic integrity, especially with respect to increased plagiarism and use of poor-quality sources found on the internet. Technology has also increased opportunities for collaborative writing, raising issues of proper attribution of authorship. There are also problems with hyperauthorship, selling authorship, and unearned authorship.

Impact: the university 
Academic integrity means avoiding plagiarism and cheating, among other misconduct behaviours. Academic integrity is practiced in the majority of educational institutions, it is noted in mission statements, policies, procedures, and honor codes, but it is also being taught in ethics classes and being noted in syllabi. Many universities have sections on their websites devoted to academic integrity which define what the term means to their specific institution. Generally this concerns six core values: Fairness, honesty, trust, respect, responsibility, and courage.

Honor code can help improve trust and honesty to students and give credits to those that actually wrote it. It can help teachers and students create an honor pledge that allows them to have severe punishments to those who committed academic dishonesty. The honor pledge is created before the assignment is assigned and need to be read over and signed, so it can show that the student is agreeing to not violate any rules.

Universities have moved toward an inclusive approach to inspiring academic integrity, by creating Student Honor Councils as well as taking a more active role in making students aware of the consequences for academic dishonesty.

Academic Integrity is also the meaning of what it truly feels to be involved with many on campus activities, and making contributions to local community.

Gary Pavela, Director of Judicial Programs and Student Ethical Development, University of Maryland stated that "Promoting student moral development requires affirming shared values. More colleges are starting to focus on one value that goes to the heart of the academic enterprise: a commitment to honesty in the pursuit of truth."

To promote the academic integrity, publication ethics, and responsible research in the higher education system in India, the University Grants Commission (India) enacted the "UGC (Promotion of Academic Integrity and Prevention of Plagiarism in Higher Educational Institutions) Regulations, 2018" on July 23, 2018. The Regulations then recommend some institutional mechanisms to eliminate the scope of plagiarism. 

Apart from the Assessment Guide, the Computer Science and Engineering Department of The Chinese University of Hong Kong has invented a plagiarism detection software system named as VeriGuide. This system aims at upholding the academic honesty levels of various academic institutions (such as: universities, community colleges). Through its website, the system provides a platform for students and educators to manage and submit academic works (i.e. student assignments). The system also provides as a function of analyzing the readability of academic works and serve as an assignment collection system and database.

Despite these advances, academic dishonesty still plagues the university. In the 1990s, the academic dishonesty rates were as bad as, and in some cases, worse than they were in the 1960s. The acknowledgement of this ethics crisis is inspiring many universities to focus more on promoting common values of academic integrity.

Conversely, critics have drawn attention to the fact that "teaching and learning are interrupted because faculty, in an effort to control plagiarism and protect notions of intellectual capital, are forced to engage with the students as detectives rather than as teachers, advisors, or mentors. The focus on controlling plagiarism among students is critiqued as unnecessarily legalistic and the rules more rigid than those necessarily accorded to intellectual property law (Marsh, 2004)". Similarly, contributions made from a societal perspective question or critique previously unexamined assumptions of the "inherent goodness, universality, and absoluteness of independence, originality, and authorship (Valentine, 2006). Authors who write about the societal dimension such as Ede and Lundsford (2001) do not suggest the elimination of notions of individual authorship and the unconditional acceptance of copying and collaboration in its place. Rather, the societal dimension highlights the need to consider both and the importance of deconstructing how the idea of the "individual author" might be serving (or not serving) the goals of teaching (learning), service, and research. Postsecondary education institutions are urged to step back from the mindless or fear-based ready adoption of the "turnitin culture" (Maruca, 2005) to allow for such question asking in the spirit of enhancing academic integrity and the teaching and learning environment."

See also
Academic dishonesty
Research integrity
Exam proctoring
Contract cheating
Plagiarism

Journals 
Peer-reviewed and practitioner journals that address topics related to academic integrity include:

 International Journal for Educational Integrity
 Journal of Academic Ethics
 Canadian Perspectives on Academic Integrity

References

External links

Rhode Island College LibGuide – Academic Integrity
Publication ethics checklist (for routine use during manuscript submission to a journal)

Integrity
Cheating in school